Demokratia ('Democracy') was a weekly newspaper published from Gjirokastër, Albania 1925-1939. Demokratia was published and edited by Xhevat Kallajxhiu. He founded the newspaper in 1925. Politically, the newspaper had an independent editorial line. It became widely read.

In December 1928 Demokratia became the platform for Branko Merxhani and Vangjel Koça to promote Neo-Albanianism.

References

1925 establishments in Albania
1939 disestablishments in Albania
Albanian-language newspapers
Defunct newspapers published in Albania
Mass media in Gjirokastër
Publications established in 1925
Publications disestablished in 1939